The Virtue Party is a political party of Azerbaijan. Its founding congress was held 20 June 2005. Gündüz Hacıyev is chairman of the party, which already claims some 2,000 members. Among other things, it stands for the restoration of Azeri control over the contested Nagorno-Karabakh region.

2005 establishments in Azerbaijan
Political parties established in 2005
Political parties in Azerbaijan